Brendan Kyle Akeem Christian (born 11 December 1983) is a sprinter from Antigua and Barbuda who specializes in the 200 metres. Born in Antigua, he is the son of Donald Christian who competed in the 1976 Summer Olympics in Montreal as a cyclist. His personal best 100 metres time is 10.09 seconds, achieved in June 2009 in Nivelles.  He is also a holder of the Antiguan and Barbudan record in 4 x 100 metres relay with 39.90 seconds.

As a junior, he won the silver medal in this event at the 2002 World Junior Championships, where he also finished sixth in the 100 metres race. He then competed at the 2004 Summer Olympics, reaching the quarter-final, and the 2006 Commonwealth Games where he reached the semi-final.

In 2007 he won the 100 metres bronze medal and the 200 metres gold medal at the Pan American Games. Shortly after, at the 2007 World Championships, he reached the semi-finals in both events. There, he set a national record in the 200 metres of 20.23 seconds.

Christian represented Antigua and Barbuda at the 2008 Summer Olympics in Beijing. He competed at the 200 metres and placed second in his first round heat after Aaron Armstrong in a time of 20.58 seconds. He improved his time in the second round to 20.26 seconds and won his race in front of Churandy Martina and Kristof Beyens. He ran his semi final race in 20.29 seconds and placed fifth, failing to achieve a spot in the Olympic final.

At the 2012 Summer Olympics, he again reached the semi-finals, but again placed fifth, missing out on a place in the final.

References

External links

1983 births
Living people
Antigua and Barbuda male sprinters
Athletes (track and field) at the 2004 Summer Olympics
Athletes (track and field) at the 2008 Summer Olympics
Athletes (track and field) at the 2012 Summer Olympics
Olympic athletes of Antigua and Barbuda
Athletes (track and field) at the 2006 Commonwealth Games
Athletes (track and field) at the 2007 Pan American Games
Pan American Games gold medalists for Antigua and Barbuda
Pan American Games bronze medalists for Antigua and Barbuda
Commonwealth Games competitors for Antigua and Barbuda
Pan American Games medalists in athletics (track and field)
Medalists at the 2007 Pan American Games